Dennis "Boog" Highberger (born September 26, 1959) is an American politician. He has served as a City Council member in Lawrence, Kansas from 2003 through 2009 and was the city's mayor from 2005 through 2006. He graduated from the University of Kansas School of Law in 1992. He was an attorney with the Kansas Department of Health and Environment (KDHE) from 1992 to 2011. He has been a Democratic member for the 46th district in the Kansas House of Representatives since 2015.

References

1959 births
Living people
Democratic Party members of the Kansas House of Representatives
21st-century American politicians
People from Garnett, Kansas
University of Kansas School of Law alumni